The 1989–90 Austrian Hockey League season was the 60th season of the Austrian Hockey League, the top level of ice hockey in Austria. Eight teams participated in the league, and VEU Feldkirch won the championship.

Regular season

Playoffs

Quarterfinals

Semifinals

Final

5th-8th place

Relegation 

EHC Lustenau was relegated.

External links
Austrian Ice Hockey Association

1989–90
Aus
League